"Five More Minutes" is a song by American pop rock group Jonas Brothers. It was released on May 15, 2020. The song was released concurrently with "X". Both of these songs were released as part of a conjoined single titled XV.

Background
During the 62nd Grammy Awards on January 26, 2020, the band opened the performance with the song. On May 12, 2020, the day after announcing the release of "X", they announced the release of the song for May 15, 2020.
The singles "Five More Minutes" and "X" were both featured in their tour documentary called Happiness Continues: A Jonas Brothers Concert Film, which was released in April 2020. During an interview with Insider, Kevin Jonas said "I think 'Five More Minutes' is one of my favorite songs in this body of work that we have [..] It was written at our writing camp when we went away as a group with all of our friends and it's just fantastic. It feels good, it's an amazing song."

Critical reception
Billboards Stephen Daw said that "Five More Minutes" is a "harmonious love ballad where the trio begged their respective wives to 'give me five more minutes with you.'" Rolling Stones Aletha legaspi said “Five More Minutes” showcases the band's softer side. The yearning ballad’s chorus pleads for more time with a loved one.

Live performances
They performed the single live during the 62nd Annual Grammy Awards as well as the previous-released track called, "What a Man Gotta Do".

Charts

Release history

References

2020 singles
2020 songs
Jonas Brothers songs
Songs written by Nick Jonas
Songs written by Joe Jonas
Songs written by Kevin Jonas
Songs written by Zach Skelton
2020s ballads